Jean d'Orléans, Count of Dunois (23 November 1402 – 24 November 1468), known as the "Bastard of Orléans" or simply Jean de Dunois, was a French military leader during the Hundred Years' War who participated in military campaigns with Joan of Arc.  His nickname, the "Bastard of Orléans", was a mark of his high status, since it acknowledged him as a first cousin to the king and acting head of a cadet branch of the royal family during his half-brother's captivity. In 1439 he received the county of Dunois from his half-brother Charles, Duke of Orléans, and later king Charles VII made him count of Longueville.

Life
Jean was the illegitimate son of Louis I, Duke of Orléans – son of King Charles V of France – and his mistress Mariette d'Enghien. In 1407, Jean's father, Louis I, Duke of Orléans was assassinated. Eight years later, his half-brother, Charles, Duke of Orléans was captured at the Battle of Agincourt and remained a prisoner of the English for twenty-five years. This left Jean the only adult male to represent the house of Orléans. He was Knight of the Order of the Porcupine.

Jean joined the civil war in France in the time of Charles VI on the side of the Armagnacs, and was captured by the Burgundians in 1418. Released in 1420, he entered the service of the Dauphin Charles, fighting in the Hundred Years' War against English forces. In 1427, Jean, along with Arthur of Richemont and Etienne of Vignolles forced the Earl of Warwick to raise his siege of Montargis. He was wounded, the next year, at the battle of Rouvray. Jean led the French defenses at the siege of Orléans, and together with Joan of Arc relieved the siege. He joined her on the campaigns of 1429 and remained active after her death.

Jean took part in the coronation of Charles VII and in 1436 aided in the recapture of Paris, and in 1439 he was created Count of Dunois. He was prominent in the conquest of Guienne and Normandy in the final years of the Hundred Years War.

Jean participated in the Praguerie against Charles VII and was a leader of the League of the Public Weal against King Louis XI in 1465, but each time he regained favor at court.

Marriages and progeny
He married Marie Louvet (d. 1426) in April 1422 at Bourges, by whom he had no children.

He married a second time to Marie of Harcourt (d. 1464), Lady of Parthenay 26 October 1439 and had four children:
Jean (1443-1453)
 François Ι d'Orléans-Longueville (1447–1491), Count of Dunois, Tancarville, Longueville, and Montgomery, married 2 July 1466 to Agnès of Savoy (1445–1508)
 Louis I d'Orléans, duc de Longueville
Marie (1440-?), married 1466 to Louis de la Haye, Lord of Passavant and Mortagne.
 Catherine d'Orléans (1449–1501), married 14 May 1468 to Johann VII of Saarbrücken-Commercy (1430–1492), Count of Roucy

Titles
 Lord of Valbonais (1421–1468)
 Count of Mortain (1424–1425)
 Viscount of Saint-Sauveur
 Count of Périgord (1430–1439)
 Count of Dunois (1439–1468)
 Count of Longueville (1443–1468)

References

Sources

Further reading
 Jean de Dunois biography at xenophongroup.com
Jean de Dunois biography at jean-claude.colrat.pagesperso-orange.fr
Book of Hours, Use of Rome ('The Dunois Hours') (BL Yates Thompson 3

|-

People of the Hundred Years' War
House of Valois-Orléans
Counts of Dunois
Counts of Mortain
Armagnac faction
Counts of Périgord
Counts of Longueville
Viscounts of Saint-Sauveur
1402 births
1468 deaths

Knights of the Order of the Porcupine